Unit 234 is an upcoming American thriller film directed by Andy Tennant and starring Isabelle Fuhrman.  Don Johnson, who also stars, and Colleen Camp serve as executive producers of the film.

Cast
Don Johnson
Isabelle Fuhrman as Laurie Saltair
Jack Huston
 James DuMont
Christopher James Baker
 Manny Galan
 Juvian Marquez
 Anirudh Pisharody

Production
Filming occurred in the Cayman Islands in April 2022.  In May 2022, it was announced that Jack Huston joined the cast of the film.

References

External links
 

Upcoming films
American thriller films
Films shot in the Cayman Islands
Films directed by Andy Tennant